Hamilton High School is a public high school for boys located in Bulawayo, Zimbabwe.

Hamilton High School was ranked 5th out of the top 100 best high schools in Africa by Africa Almanac in 2003, based upon quality of education, student engagement, strength and activities of alumni, school profile, internet and news visibility.

History
Founded in 1959, until 1981 Hamilton High School had just three headmasters – 1959 to 1965 I.H. (Ian Hall) Grant, 1966 to 1975 E.C.W. Silcock, and 1976 to 1981 JPB Armstrong.

Notable alumni

 Bruce Grobbelaar - goalkeeper for Liverpool Football Club.
Gary Crocker - cricketer.
David Smith - rugby player
Saxon Logan Renowned internationally award winning film maker

See also
 List of schools in Zimbabwe

References

External links
 Hamilton High School In Pictures – virtual tour

Boys' schools in Zimbabwe
Boys' high schools in Zimbabwe
Buildings and structures in Bulawayo
Educational institutions established in 1959
High schools in Zimbabwe
Education in Bulawayo
1959 establishments in Southern Rhodesia